H.120 was the first digital video compression standard. It was developed by COST 211 and published by the CCITT (now the ITU-T) in 1984, with a revision in 1988 that included contributions proposed by other organizations. The video turned out not to be of adequate quality, there were few implementations, and there are no existing codecs for the format, but it provided important knowledge leading directly to its practical successors, such as H.261. The latest revision was published in March 1993.

Stream format

H.120 streams ran at 1544 kbit/s for NTSC and 2048 kbit/s for PAL. Version 1 (1984) featured conditional replenishment, differential pulse-code modulation (DPCM), scalar quantization, variable-length coding and a switch for sampling. Version 2 (1988) added motion compensation and
background prediction. A final edition (without new technical content) was published in 1993 as a result of the creation of the ITU-T to replace the prior CCITT standardization body.

Problems and knowledge gained

H.120 video was not of good enough quality for practical use — it had very good spatial resolution (as differential PCM works on a pixel-by-pixel basis), but very poor temporal quality. It became clear to researchers that to improve the video quality without exceeding the target bitrate for the stream, it would be necessary to encode using an average of less than one bit for each pixel. This would require groups of pixels to be coded together. This led to the discrete cosine transform (DCT) block-based codecs that followed H.120, such as H.261, the first practical video encoding standard.

References

External links 
H.120 : Codecs for videoconferencing using primary digital group transmission (ITU)

ITU-T recommendations
ITU-T H Series Recommendations
H.26x
Video codecs